The 1913–14 Georgetown Hoyas men's basketball team represented Georgetown University during the 1913–14 NCAA college basketball season. James Colliflower coached the team in his third season as head coach. Georgetown was an independent and played its home games at the Arcade Rink, also known as the Arcadia and as the Arcade Auditorium, in Washington, D.C., and finished the season with a record of 10–6.

Season recap

Senior forward Ronayne "Roy" Waldron was the team captain for the second straight season, a rare honor and the first player so honored in school history. Also for the second straight year, he led the team in scoring; playing in 11 games and starting each of the 11, he scored a total of 79 points, averaging 7.2 points per game. He ended his collegiate career having played in 42 games and started 33 times, scoring 326 points and averaging 7.8 points per game, and he ranks third in scoring among Georgetown players who played between the 1906-07 and 1919-20 seasons. During his four seasons with the team, the Hoyas never had a losing season and were 35–5 on their home court.

Colliflower had coached the Hoyas for three seasons, posting an overall record of 32-17 and shepherding the men's basketball program through disputes over it between the undergraduate campus and the Law School. A part-time coach who made ends meet by attending to his coal delivery business, he stepped down as coach and returned to that business after this season when Georgetown hired John O'Reilly to succeed him as a full-time head coach. When O'Reilly later fell ill and could not coach, Colliflower returned to serve as head coach without pay during the 1921-22 season.

The Hoyas began to play their home games at Ryan Gymnasium the following season, so this was the last Georgetown men's basketball team to play its home games off campus until the team left Ryan to return to the Arcade Rink for the 1927-28 season.

Roster
Sources

Georgetown players did not wear numbers on their jerseys this season. The first numbered jerseys in Georgetown mens basketball history would not appear until the 1933-34 season.

1913–14 schedule and results
Sources

It was common practice at this time for colleges and universities to include non-collegiate opponents in their schedules, with the games recognized as part of their official record for the season, and games played against the Washington YMCA and the Maryland Athletic Club counted as part of Georgetowns won-loss record for 1913–14. It was not until 1952, after the completion of the 1951–52 season, that the National Collegiate Athletic Association (NCAA) ruled that colleges and universities could no longer count games played against non-collegiate opponents in their annual won-loss records.

|-
!colspan=9 style="background:#002147; color:#8D817B;"| Regular Season

References

Georgetown Hoyas men's basketball seasons
Georgetown
Georgetown Hoyas men's basketball team
Georgetown Hoyas men's basketball team